Liu Cong may refer to:

Liu Cong (Han dynasty) (fl. 207–208), younger son of the late Han dynasty warlord Liu Biao
Liu Cong (Han Zhao) (died 318), emperor of Han Zhao of the Sixteen Kingdoms